Player Hating: A Love Story is a 2010 documentary film about Brooklyn rapper Half a Mill, written and directed by Maggie Hadleigh-West.

Premise
The documentary follows Half a Mill and his Brooklyn crew, The Godfia Criminals, as they record and struggle to launch Milíon, Half a Mill's latest album. Player Hating explores the connections of poverty, alienation, gangs, and violence in the lives of young "thugs".

External links
 
 

2010 films
American documentary films
2010 documentary films
Documentary films about hip hop music and musicians
2010s English-language films
2010s American films